Bosher or Boshers is a surname.  Notable people with this name include:

Carolyn Maloney (née Carolyn Jane Bosher, born 1946), politician serving as U.S. Representative 
Matt Bosher (born 1987), American football punter in the National Football League
Kate Langley Bosher (1865–1932), American novelist
Buddy Boshers (born 1988), American baseball pitcher

See also
Bosher Dam, in the James River near Richmond, Virginia